Northpoint City, formerly known as Northpoint Shopping Centre, is a suburban shopping mall in Yishun, Singapore. Located opposite Yishun MRT station, the mall houses the Nee Soon Central Community Club, Yishun Public Library as well as the Yishun Bus Interchange, which forms part of the Yishun Integrated Transport Hub (ITH).

The mall was first built in 1992, and was renovated and expanded in 2010. It susbeqeuently underwent a second renovation and expansion from 2017 to 2018. It is currently the largest shopping mall in northern Singapore. The centre has a combined net lettable area of at least  and houses more than 400 tenants.

History
Northpoint City was originally called the Northpoint Shopping Centre, having been first constructed in November 1992 as the first suburban mall to be built in the northern heartlands of Singapore. Cold Storage, Swensen's and Giordano were one of the first few outlets to open in the Northpoint Shopping Centre.

Renamed and expanded
In July 2017, Northpoint Shopping Centre was renamed as Northpoint City, with the existing building becoming its north wing. The south wing of the mall was opened in December 2017, integrating Northpoint City with the Yishun Integrated Transport Hub (ITH) and Nee Soon Central Community Club. It was the first time in Singapore that different public facilities were integrated in this manner. A 920-unit condominium called the North Park Residences was also constructed atop Northpoint City.

Yishun Public Library reopened on 3 February 2018, located at the fourth level of the North Wing. A linkway to the South Wing from the MRT station was also constructed.

Facilities 
The two wings of Northpoint City are connected via an underground garden at in the basement.

Notable tenants include Cold Storage, Harvey Norman, Popular, Timezone, UNIQLO, Kopitiam, Anytime Fitness, NTUC FairPrice, Yishun Public Library and Krispy Kreme.

Transport 
Northpoint City is directly connected to the Yishun Integrated Transport Hub (ITH), which includes Yishun MRT station and Yishun Bus Interchange.

Gallery

See also
 List of shopping malls in Singapore

References

External links
 

Shopping malls in Singapore
Yishun
1992 establishments in Singapore